"Apodictic", also spelled "apodeictic" ("capable of demonstration"), is an adjectival expression from Aristotelean logic that refers to propositions that are demonstrably, necessarily or self-evidently true. Apodicticity or apodixis is the corresponding abstract noun, referring to logical certainty.

Apodictic propositions contrast with assertoric propositions, which merely assert that something is (or is not) true, and with problematic propositions, which assert only the possibility of something's being true. Apodictic judgments are clearly provable or logically certain. For instance, "Two plus two equals four" is apodictic, because it is true by definition. "Things fall" is also apodictic, because it is easily demonstrated and obvious to the listener. "Chicago is larger than Omaha" is assertoric. "A corporation could be wealthier than a country" is problematic. In Aristotelian logic, "apodictic" is opposed to "dialectic", as scientific proof is opposed to philosophical reasoning. Kant contrasted "apodictic" with "problematic" and "assertoric" in the Critique of Pure Reason, on page A70/B95.

Apodictic a priorism
Hans Reichenbach, one of the founders of logical positivism, offered a modified version of Immanuel Kant's a priorism by distinguishing between apodictic a priorism and constitutive a priorism.

References

 Antony Flew. A Dictionary of Philosophy - Revised Second Edition. St. Martin's Press, NY, 1979

External links
 

Modal logic
Term logic